Agustín Tamames Iglesias (born 19 October 1944) is a former Spanish road racing cyclist.  In 1975 he won the overall title and five stages of the Vuelta a España. Over his entire career, Tamames won 11 stage wins at the Vuelta a España. He also competed in the individual road race at the 1968 Summer Olympics.

Major achievements 

1970
 2nd, Overall, Vuelta a España
 1st, KoM
 1st, Stage 9
1971
 7th, Overall, Vuelta a España
 1st, Stage 9
1972
 3rd, Overall, Vuelta a España
 1st, Stage 13
 1st, Stage 16
1974
 17th, Overall, Vuelta a España
 1st, Stage 17
 1st, Stage 18
1975
  1st, Overall, Vuelta a España
 1st, Stage 3
 1st, Stage 12
 1st, Stage 14
 1st, Stage 15
 1st, Stage 16
 3rd, Overall, Tour of the Basque Country
 1st, Stage 1
 1st, Stage 4
1976
  National Road Race Champion

References

External links
Complete Palmarès

Official Tour de France results for Agustín Tamames

1944 births
Living people
Spanish male cyclists
Vuelta a España winners
Spanish Vuelta a España stage winners
Sportspeople from the Province of Salamanca
Olympic cyclists of Spain
Cyclists at the 1968 Summer Olympics
Cyclists from Castile and León